Serpent's Embrace is the fourth studio album by the German symphonic black metal band Agathodaimon.  It was released 24 August 2004 through Nuclear Blast records. In 2009 Metal Mind Productions reissued the album as a remastered digipak edition. The reissue is limited to numerated 2000 copies and was digitally remastered using 24-Bit process on golden disc.

The album had a more progressive style compared to previous albums. Allmusic described the album as one that "does not play by pre-established black metal rules" and a "genre-busting" LP.

Track listing 

 The bonus CD tracks 1-3 are demo versions, and 5-8 are taken from the band's 1997 Near Dark demo.

Personnel
 Sathonys - guitars, clean vocals
 Matze - drums
 Frank "Akaias" Nordmann - vocals
 Felix Ü. Walzer - keyboards
 Eddie - bass

Additional personnel and staff
 Ruth Knepel - female vocals
 Kristian Kohlmannslehner - producer, mixing
 Katja Piolka - photography

References

Agathodaimon (band) albums
Nuclear Blast albums
2004 albums